Abul Hussam is the inventor of the Sono arsenic filter. He is a chemistry professor at George Mason University (GMU) in Fairfax, Virginia, and a member of advisory board at Shahjalal University of Science and Technology.

Life and career
Hussam was born in Kushtia, and raised in Bangladesh. Hussam moved to the United States in 1978 for graduate studies. Later he received a doctorate in analytical chemistry and became a naturalized citizen of the US. The Centreville, Virginia, resident has spent much of this career trying to devise a solution to the problem of arsenic contamination of groundwater in eastern India and Bangladesh.

Hussam started working on this problem in 1993. His final innovation is a simple, maintenance-free system that uses sand, charcoal, bits of brick and shards of a type of cast iron. The filter removes almost every trace of arsenic from the well water. The wells brought fresh groundwater to farmers and others who previously had been drinking from bacteria- and virus-laced ponds and mudholes.

He also had to devise a way to find an accurate way to measure arsenic in water. This was achieved in the early of the mid-1990s.

The National Academy of Engineering announced on February 1, 2007, that the 2007 Grainger challenge prize for sustainability would go to Hussam. Hussam's invention is already in use today, preventing serious health problems in residents of the professor's native Bangladesh. This includes a $1 million award, which Hussam plans to use most of to distribute the filters to needy communities around the world.

Hussam said he plans to use 70 percent of his prize so the filters can be distributed to needy communities. He said 25 percent will be used for more research, and 5 percent will be donated to GMU.

The 2007 sustainability prize is funded by the Grainger Foundation of Lake Forest, Illinois, and the contest was set up to target the arsenic problem. Among the criteria for winning was an affordable, reliable and environmentally friendly solution to the arsenic problem that did not require electricity.

His younger brothers are Dr. Abul Barkat and Dr. AKM Munir.

Education
 BSc (honors) in chemistry, University of Dhaka, 1975  
 MSc in chemistry, University of Dhaka, 1976
 PhD in analytical chemistry from University of Pittsburgh, Pennsylvania, 1982.

Professional positions
 Director, Center for Clean Water and Sustainable Technologies, George Mason University
 Professor, Department of Chemistry and Biochemistry, George Mason University
 Visiting research scholar at Georgetown University and at Case Western Reserve University.

Scientific papers
Professor Hussam has published and presented over 100 scientific papers in international journals, proceedings, and books.

Honors and awards
 Doctor of Science (D.Sc.) by University of Dhaka in 2009.
 Professor Hussam was awarded one of the highest engineering prizes known as the 2007 Grainger Challenge Prize for Sustainability from the US National Academy of Engineering (NAE) for the Sono arsenic filter which is now used by thousands of people in the affected areas of Bangladesh, Nepal, and India.
 He was recognized by the Time magazine with a Global Heroes of the Environment 2007 Award
 The Outstanding American by Choice Award by US Citizenship and Immigration Services in 2008
 Distinguished Alumni Award for "creativity, leadership, and accomplishments" by the Department of Chemistry, University of Pittsburgh
 His present research on the measurement of trace arsenic, aquatic chemistry of arsenic in groundwater, and the development of a simple arsenic filters has been recognized through international publications and accolades. His work is now described in chemistry and engineering text books and cited as one of the most significant contributions in water purification technologies.

References

External links
 
2007 Grainger Challenge Prize Gold Award Winner National Academy of Engineering
Invention description at GMU website
 National Academies Press Release, accessed February 5, 2007.

Year of birth missing (living people)
Living people
People from Centreville, Virginia
21st-century American chemists
20th-century American inventors
21st-century American inventors
Bangladeshi emigrants to the United States
Abul Hussam
Abul Hussam
George Mason University faculty
Scientists from Virginia
University of Pittsburgh alumni
People from Kushtia District